Are Marler is an Indian Tulu-language film directed by Devadas Kapikad, who also appears in a supporting role. The film's stars are Arjun Kapikad and Nishmitha. The film was released on 11 August 2017. The film had crossed 100 days at Big Cinemas.

Plot 
Sakshi, the daughter of a millionaire and a vivacious girl, plays pranks on Shekara as a part of her project. Shekara falls in love with her and his unemployed friends help him impress her.

Soundtrack

The soundtrack of the film was composed by Devadas Kapikad and background score by Manikanth Kadri. The soundtrack album was released in June 2017 with the Anand Audio acquiring the audio rights.

Cast
 Arjun Kapikad
 Nishmitha
 Aryan Ashik as Gopi
 Arjun Kaje
 Devadas Kapikad

List of Tulu Movies 
List of tulu films of 2015
 List of Tulu films of 2014
 List of Released Tulu films
 Tulu cinema
  Tulu Movie Actors
  Tulu Movie Actresses
 Karnataka State Film Award for Best Regional film
 RED FM Tulu Film Awards
 Tulu Cinemotsava 2015

References

External links 

Tulu-language films